Kurozuka is the grave of an onibaba in Fukushima Prefecture, Japan.

Kurozuka may also refer to:

 Onibaba (folklore), the mythical creature also called "Kurozuka"
 Kurozuka (novel), a Japanese novel, manga and anime series